Maia Reficco Viqueira (born July 14, 2000) is an Argentine-American actress and singer. She is known for roles in the Nickelodeon Latin America original series, Kally's Mashup, and in the horror thriller series Pretty Little Liars: Original Sin, a spinoff of Pretty Little Liars.

Early life 

Reficco was born in Boston, Massachusetts, and at the age of six, she moved to Buenos Aires, Argentina, with her family of Argentine origin. From a young age, she showed interest in music, singing and playing the guitar, piano, saxophone and ukulele. Her mother Katie Viqueira is a singer and singing teacher, and is the director of her own Center for Vocal Art, and her father Ezequiel Reficco is a professor at the University of Los Andes in Bogotá. She has a younger brother, Joaquín Reficco Viqueira, who is also a singer. Reficco did acrobatics for 11 years. At the age of 15, she traveled to Los Angeles, and lived with Claudia Brant, where she had the opportunity to study singing with Eric Vetro, a vocal coach for artists such as Ariana Grande, Camila Cabello and Shawn Mendes. She also attended a five-week program at Berklee College of Music in Boston in which she excelled, earning a scholarship.

Career 

She came to the Nickelodeon Latin America project Kally's Mashup thanks to Claudia Brant and the Instagram social network; Brant was the one who was in charge of sending the covers that Reficco made of different artists and uploaded to the platform, then she was contacted by the production of the series for an audition. Reficco auditioned with the Ariana Grande song "Dangerous Woman". She managed to get the leading role of the series playing Kally Ponce. Reficco signed with the record company Deep Well Records and traveled to Miami to record music for the series. On October 19, 2017, Reficco appeared for the first time at the Kids' Choice Awards Argentina presenting the theme song for the series "Key of Life".

In August 2018, Reficco performed at the Kids' Choice Awards Mexico, where she sang the song "World's Collide" and "Unísono" with the cast of Kally's Mashup. The same month, in an interview with Billboard Argentina, Reficco confirmed that she was working on her record material as a soloist in conjunction with a major label, as well as revealing that her debut album will be of the pop and R&B genre. Her album will also be fully in English. She performed at the KCA Argentina 2018, where she sang the song "World's Collide" and "Unísono" again with the cast of Kally's Mashup. On November 7, Reficco appeared at the Meus Prêmios Nick 2018, where she performed the same songs again, but this time "Unísono", together with Alex Hoyer and Lalo Brito; that same night, Reficco was awarded as "Favorite TV Artist". In 2022, she appeared in Do Revenge, a Netflix film, and starred as Noa Olivar in HBO Max series Pretty Little Liars: Original Sin.

Filmography

Film/Television

Theater

Discography

References

External links 

 
 
 Maia Reficco on Twitter

Living people
21st-century American actresses
21st-century American women singers
21st-century American singers
21st-century Argentine actresses
21st-century Argentine women singers
American people of Argentine descent
American television actresses
American film actresses
Argentine people of Brazilian descent
Argentine television actresses
Argentine film actresses
2000 births